The Hanseong sunbo was Korea's first modern newspaper. It began publication on October 31, 1883 as the official mouthpiece of the Korean government. It was published by the Office of Culture and Information (Bangmunguk, 박문국, 博文局) and used Hanmun (literary Chinese) throughout. It appeared three times a month until its closure in 1884 in the wake of the failed Gapsin Coup. It later reemerged in 1886 as a weekly, the Hanseong Jubo (한성주보, 漢城周報), now using a mixture of Hangul and Hanja scripts. Its contents included editorials, news, literary commentary, and even advertisements.

Korea's first newspaper was the bilingual Chosen shinpo, introduced by the Japanese in the treaty port of Busan in 1881.

References

See also 
List of newspapers by date
Hwangseong sinmun
Tongnip Sinmun

Korean-language newspapers
Newspapers published in Korea
Bilingual newspapers
Newspapers established in 1883